Magnolia Award for Best Actor is awarded under the Shanghai Television Festival.

References

Shanghai Television Festival